Beltre is a surname. Notable people with the surname include:

Adrián Beltré (born 1979), baseball third-baseman
Esteban Beltré (born 1967), baseball shortstop
Frank Beltre (born 1990), American football player
Manuel Beltre (born 2004), Dominican baseball player

Spanish-language surnames